The 2007 Euro Beach Soccer League, was the tenth edition of the Euro Beach Soccer League (EBSL), the premier beach soccer competition contested between European men's national teams, occurring annually since its establishment in 1998. The league was organised by Beach Soccer Worldwide (BSWW) between June 29 and August 26, 2007 in six different nations across Europe.

Changes made to the structure of the league in 2006 remained in place for this season. However, there were some notable adjustments to the organisation of Division B – the lower tier season was shortened dramatically to just one round of matches involving all nations and hence was renamed as the Preliminary round for this season.

Spain entered the tournament as defending champions but lost to Portugal in the Superfinal semi-finals. The Portuguese proceeded to win the title, beating France in the final to claim their second European crown, having first won five years prior in 2002. This was France's third runner-up finish in the EBSL and their last top four placing to date.

The league also doubled as the European qualification process for the 2007 FIFA Beach Soccer World Cup. The nations finishing in first, second, third and fourth place qualified, along with the winners of the last chance bracket.

Preliminary round (Division B)
Traditionally known as Division B, the lower tier of teams' competition was called the Preliminary Round this season.

It took place prior to the Division A season. The event decided which four nations would advance to play in Division A later in the year alongside the top tier's automatic entrants.

For this season, BSWW discarded the traditional multi-stage regular season for lower tier nations. In place of this was organised a single round of matches to decide those to progress to Division A. Since the division consisted of just one stage of fixtures, all 12 teams participated, split into four groups of three, competing in a round robin format.

Unlike in previous years, the overall division table did not determine the successful teams to progress to the next stage of their EBSL campaign. Instead, each of the four group winners secured a place in Division A.

The preliminary round took place in Athens, Greece.

Teams

Key

Group A

Group B

Group C

Group D

Division A
Following the completion of Division B, Division A commenced.

Division A consisted of four rounds of fixtures known as stages, with one stage hosted in each of the four nations which received automatic entry into the division. All eight teams took part in each stage.

Each stage was played as a straight knockout tournament. All eight teams contesting the stage title started in the quarter-finals, playing one match per round until the final when the winner of the stage was crowned. The losers of the quarter and semi-finals played in consolation matches to determine their final league placements.

Point distribution
Unlike in previous years, points earned by the participating teams for winning matches did not count towards league table. Instead, the system of awarding points established last season in 2006 continued to be used (with minor alterations) – teams earned points for the league table based on their final placement in each stage from 10 points for winning the stage, down to 1 point for finishing last.

The breakdown of the distribution of points is shown in the table below:

Teams

Automatic entrants

Division B qualifiers

Stage 1
The first stage of Division A took place in San Benedetto del Tronto, Italy.

Dates: QFs – 13 July; SFs – 14 July; Finals – 15 July

Results

Awards

Final standings

Stage 2
The second stage of Division A took place in Portimão, Portugal.

Dates: QFs – 19 July; SFs – 20 July; Finals – 21 July

Results

Awards

Final standings

Stage 3
The third stage of Division A took place in Tignes, France.

Dates: QFs – 27 July; SFs – 28 July; Finals – 29 July

Results

Awards

Final standings

Stage 4
The fourth stage of Division A took place in Palma de Mallorca, Mallorca, Spain.

Dates: QFs – 3 August; SFs – 4 August; Finals – 5 August

Results

Awards

Final standings

Final table
Following the completion of all four stages, the final Division A table was drawn up. The top six nations qualified for the Superfinal.

Superfinal
The Superfinal took place at the Plages du Prado, Marsielle, France.

The playoff event was organised as a multi-stage tournament; starting with a group stage, the six qualified nations were split into two groups of three, playing in a round robin format. The top two from each group advanced to the semi-finals from which point on the Superfinal was played as a knockout tournament until the winner of the 2007 EBSL was crowned, with an additional match to determine third place.

The semifinalists secured qualification to the 2007 FIFA Beach Soccer World Cup.

Group stage

Group A

Group B

Knockout stage

Championship match details

Superfinal final standings

Last chance bracket

European nations were granted five berths at the 2007 FIFA Beach Soccer World Cup. As Superfinal semifinalists, Portugal, Spain, Russia and France successfully claimed four of these spots. This meant one berth was yet to be filled. This berth was contested in a final round of the 2007 EBSL, independent from the normal proceedings of the league, known as the Last chance bracket. Played as a knockout tournament, parallel to the staging of the Superfinal, Italy won the event and claimed the final World Cup spot.

Sources

 Roonba
 RSSSF
 beachsoccer.ru (in Russian)

Euro Beach Soccer League
2007 in beach soccer